Carex vulpinoidea is a species of sedge known as fox sedge and American fox-sedge. It is native to North America, including most of Canada, the Dominican Republic, the United States and parts of Mexico. It is known in Europe and New Zealand as an introduced species. The sedge lives in wet and seasonally wet habitat, and grows easily as a roadside weed. It produces clumps of stems up to a meter tall. Tolerates fluctuating water levels and periods of drying.

References

External links
Jepson Manual Treatment
Photo gallery at Calphotos

vulpinoidea
Plants described in 1803
Flora of North America